Metzneria expositoi is a moth of the family Gelechiidae. It was described by Vives in 2001. It is found in Spain.

References

Moths described in 2001
Metzneria